Sarah Jeffrey is a Canadian oboist and teacher.

Jeffrey is Principal Oboe with the Toronto Symphony Orchestra, and has performed as a chamber musician with Trio Arkel and Amici Chamber Ensemble.

She is a faculty member at the University of Toronto, and The Glenn Gould School of The Royal Conservatory of Music.

Sarah Jeffrey has recorded the Vaughan Williams Oboe Concerto with the Toronto Symphony Orchestra for Chandos Records in 2017. The recording was nominated for two Grammy Awards, Best Classical Compendium and Best Producer, with the latter nomination winning the Grammy Award. The recording won a Juno Award for Best Classical Orchestra recording.

References

Living people
Year of birth missing (living people)
Canadian oboists
Musicians from Toronto
Toronto Symphony Orchestra members
Academic staff of the University of Toronto
Academic staff of The Royal Conservatory of Music
Women oboists